The 27th Legislative Assembly of Quebec was the Quebec, Canada provincial legislature that was elected in the 1962 Quebec general election.  It sat for six sessions, from 15 January 1963 to 11 July 1963; from 21 August 1963 to 23 August 1963; from 14 January 1964 to 31 July 1964; from 21 January 1965 to 6 August 1965; from 22 October 1965 to 23 October 1965; and from 25 January 1966 to 18 April 1966.  The Liberal government led by Jean Lesage continued the Quiet Revolution reforms begun during its first mandate. The official opposition Union Nationale was led by Daniel Johnson, Sr.

Seats per political party
 After the 1962 elections

Member list

This was the list of members of the Legislative Assembly of Quebec that were elected in the 1962 election:

Other elected MLAs

Other MLAs were elected in by-elections during this mandate

 Eric William Kierans, Quebec Liberal Party, Montréal-Notre-Dame-de-Grâce, September 25, 1963 
 Francis O'Farrell, Quebec Liberal Party, Dorchester, October 5, 1964 
 Jacques Bernier, Quebec Liberal Party, Matane, October 5, 1964 
 Pierre-Willie Maltais, Quebec Liberal Party, Saguenay, October 5, 1964 
 Claude Wagner, Quebec Liberal Party, Montréal-Verdun, October 5, 1964 
 Jean-Guy Trépanier, Quebec Liberal Party, Saint-Maurice, January 18, 1965 
 Denis Hardy, Quebec Liberal Party, Terrebonne, January 18, 1965

Cabinet Ministers

 Prime Minister and Executive Council President: Jean Lesage
 Vice-President of the Executive Council: Georges-Émile Lapalme (1962–1964), Paul Gerin-Lajoie (1964–1966)
 Agriculture and Colonization: Alcide Courcy
 Labour: René Hamel (1962–1963), Carrier Fortin (1963–1966)
 Public Works: René Saint-Pierre
 Cultural Affairs: Georges-Émile Lapalme (1962–1964), Pierre Laporte (1964–1966)
 Family and Social Welfare: Émilien Lafrance (1962–1965), René Lévesque (1965–1966)
 Youth: Paul Gérin-Lajoie (1962–1964)
 Education: Paul Gérin-Lajoie (1964–1966)
 Health: Alphonse Couturier (1962–1965), Eric William Kierans (1965–1966)
 Lands and Forests: Bona Arsenault (1962), Lucien Cliche (1962–1966)
 Fisheries and Hunting: Gérard D. Levesque (1962–1963)
 Tourism, Hunting and Fishing: Lionel Bertrand (1963–1964), Gérard Cournoyer (1964–1965), Alphonse Couturier (1965–1966)
 Natural Resources: René Lévesque (1962–1966), Gaston Binette (1966)
 Roads: Bernard Pinard
 Transportation and Communications: Gérard Cournoyer (1962–1964), Marie-Claire Kirkland (1964–1966)
 Municipal Affairs: Lucien Cliche (1962), Pierre Laporte (1962–1966)
 Federal-provincial Affairs: Jean Lesagex
 Industry and Commerce: André Rousseau (1962), Gérard D. Levesque (1962–1966)
 Attorney General: Georges-Émile Lapalme (1962–1963), René Hamel (1963–1964), Claude Wagner (1964–1965)
 Justice: Claude Wagner (1965–1966)
 Solicitor General: Claude Wagner (1964–1966)
 Provincial Secretary: Lionel Bertrand (1962–1963), Bona Arsenault (1963–1966)
 Finances: Jean Lesage
 Revenu: Paul Earl (1962–1963), Jean Lesage (1963), Eric William Kierans (1963–1966)
 State Ministers: Carrier Fortin (1962–1963), Marie-Claire Kirkland (1962–1964), Gaston Binette (1965–1966), Albert Morissette (1965–1966), Gerard Cournoyer (1965–1966), Émilien Lafrance (1965–1966)

New electoral districts

A major electoral map reform took place in 1965. The changes were effective starting in the 1966 election. Several ridings were also renamed.

 Parts of Laval were split into new ridings including Ahuntsic and Fabre
 Parts of Bourget were split to form Bourassa, Olier and LaFontaine
 Montréal-Notre-Dame-de-Grâce was renamed Notre-Dame-de-Grâce and parts of it were split to form D'Arcy-McGee.
 Montréal-Jeanne-Mance was renamed Jeanne-Mance and parts of it were split to form Dorion and Gouin.
 Dubuc was formed from parts of Chicoutimi.
 Parts of Jacques-Cartier were split to form Marguerite-Bourgeoys, Saint-Laurent and Robert-Baldwin.
 Montréal-Sainte-Anne was renamed Sainte-Anne.
 Montréal-Saint-Henri was renamed Sainte-Henri.
 Montréal-Saint-Jacques was renamed Sainte-Jacques.
 Montréal-Sainte-Marie was renamed Sainte-Marie.
 Westmount-Saint-Georges was renamed Westmount.
 Montréal-Saint-Louis was renamed Saint-Louis.
 Montréal-Verdun was renamed Verdun.
 Montréal-Laurier was renamed Laurier.
 Montréal-Outremont was renamed Outremont.
 Taillon was formed from parts of Chambly.
 Québec-Ouest was renamed Louis-Hébert.
 Québec-Est was renamed Limoilou.
 Québec County was renamed Chauveau.
 Québec-Centre was renamed Jean-Talon.
 Jonquiere-Kenogami was renamed Jonquière

References

External links
 1962 election results
 List of Historical Cabinet Ministers

27